The ÖBB Class 1042 was a class of electric locomotives operated by ÖBB in Austria. From its entry into service in the 1960s, it was an important element of the ÖBB's electrically powered operations. In the 1990s, younger members of the class were converted into Class 1142 locomotives for push–pull operation. The remaining Class 1042 units have since been withdrawn from service.

The four-axle locomotives were assembled from 1963 onwards by Simmering-Graz-Pauker at Lokomotivfabrik Floridsdorf. After the progressive electrification of the Austrian railway network in the 1950s, ÖBB required powerful new engines for operation on the mountain railway lines such as the Semmering pass route. A total of 257 were built until production discontinued in 1977.

Operations in Sweden
Hector Rail purchased twelve Class 1142 locomotives from ÖBB in 2005–2006. The Hector Rail locomotives were reclassified as "Class 142" and its performance is comparable with that of the SJ Rc locomotives.

See also 

 History of rail transport in Austria
 Rail transport in Austria

References

 This article is based upon a translation of the German language version as of November 2013.

Austrian Federal Railways electric locomotives
Brown, Boveri & Cie locomotives
Bo′Bo′  locomotives
Siemens locomotives
15 kV AC locomotives
Railway locomotives introduced in 1963
Standard gauge locomotives of Austria
Locomotives of Sweden
Electric locomotives of Sweden